Douglas Ozias Reis (born 7 May 1991), known as Douglas Reis or simply Douglas, is a Brazilian footballer who plays for Onisilos Sotira 2014 as a defender.

Club career

References

External links
 

1991 births
Living people
Brazilian footballers
Esporte Clube Rio Verde players
Trindade Atlético Clube players
Oeste Futebol Clube players
Aris Limassol FC players
AEZ Zakakiou players
Capivariano Futebol Clube players
Lagarto Futebol Clube players
Karmiotissa FC players
Onisilos Sotira players
Cypriot First Division players
Cypriot Second Division players
Brazilian expatriate footballers
Expatriate footballers in Cyprus
Brazilian expatriate sportspeople in Cyprus
Association football defenders
People from São José do Rio Preto
Footballers from São Paulo (state)